North Shropshire is a constituency in the county of Shropshire, represented in the House of Commons of the UK Parliament by Helen Morgan of the Liberal Democrats after a by-election on 16 December 2021. The former MP, Owen Paterson of the Conservatives, resigned his seat on 5 November 2021 when faced with suspension from the Commons for a breach of advocacy rules and the consequent possibility of a recall petition. The seat had previously been a safe seat for the Conservatives.

Constituency profile
The area is rural and north of Shrewsbury, west of Newcastle-under-Lyme in the Stoke conurbation, south of Cheshire and Wrexham, having five small towns (in size order): Oswestry, Market Drayton, Whitchurch, Wem and Ellesmere. Residents' health and wealth are similar to UK averages.

History
From its first creation in 1832 to the abolition of the first creation in 1885 the constituency covered approximately half of the county and elected two members, formally Knights of the Shire.  In 1885 the county was (together with South Shropshire) divided between four constituencies: Ludlow, Newport, Oswestry and Wellington.

In 1983 the constituency was revived in a smaller form and elects one Member of Parliament (MP) by the first past the post system of election.

Owen Paterson was appointed to be the Secretary of State for Northern Ireland in May 2010 and from the September 2012 Cabinet reshuffle, Secretary of State for Environment, Food and Rural Affairs, until another reshuffle in June 2014. Paterson resigned in November 2021 for breaching Commons lobbying rules while working for two firms as a consultant. A by-election was held on 16 December 2021, triggered by the resignation and was won by Helen Morgan for the Liberal Democrats with a 34% swing. The swing was seventh largest in United Kingdom by-election history.

Boundaries

1832–1885: The Hundreds of Oswestry, Pimhill, North Bradford and South Bradford, as well as the Liberty of Shrewsbury.

1983–1997: The District of North Shropshire, the Borough of Oswestry and the District of the Wrekin, wards of Church Aston, Edgmond, Ercall Magna, Newport East, Newport North, Newport West.

1997–present: The District of North Shropshire and the Borough of Oswestry.

The district councils of North Shropshire and Oswestry were abolished in 2009.

Members of Parliament

MPs 1832–1885
Constituency created in 1832

MPs since 1983

Elections

Elections in the 2020s

Elections in the 2010s

Class War originally selected Al Derby as a candidate here, but he changed to Wolverhampton North East.

Elections in the 2000s

Elections in the 1990s

Elections in the 1980s

Elections in the 1880s

Elections in the 1870s

 Caused by Gore's elevation to the peerage, becoming Lord Harlech.

Elections in the 1860s

 

 Caused by Brownlow-Cust's elevation to the peerage, becoming 3rd Earl Brownlow.

 Caused by Cust's resignation.

Elections in the 1850s

Elections in the 1840s

 Caused by Herbert's succession to the peerage, becoming 3rd Earl of Powis

 Caused by Hill's succession to the peerage, becoming 2nd Viscount Hill

Elections in the 1830s

See also
 North Shropshire by-election (disambiguation)
 Parliamentary constituencies in Shropshire

References

Sources
UK Polling Report

Parliamentary constituencies in Shropshire
Constituencies of the Parliament of the United Kingdom established in 1832
Constituencies of the Parliament of the United Kingdom disestablished in 1885
Constituencies of the Parliament of the United Kingdom established in 1983